Satya Saha (25 December 1934 – 27 January 1999) was a Bangladeshi composer, and musician. His notable composed songs are "Chena Chena Lage" by Shyamal Mitra, "Dukkho Amar Basor Raater Palonko", "Chhiti Dio Protidin" by Sabina Yasmin, "Mon Bole Tumi Asbe", "Rupali Nadire", "Bondho Hote Cheye Tomar" by Subir Nandi, "Akasher Haate Ache" by Shammi Akhter, "Tumi Ki Dekhecho Kobhu" by Abdul Jabbar, "Oi Dur Digonte", "Mago Ma Ogo Ma" etc. He earned three Bangladesh National Film Awards in 1994, 1996, and 2001 in music director and composer categories. In 2013, he was awarded Independence Day Award after his death. He was the father of musician Emon Saha and film director Sumon Saha.

Early life
Saha's father was Prasannakumar Saha. He started learning and rehearsing music from his uncle Rabindrapal Saha. He passed B.A. from Vidyasagar College in 1951–1952.

Career
Saha started his career as an assistant of composer Panchanon Mitra at Radio's Dhaka Station in 1956. From 1964 to 1999, he directed music in about two hundred different films and produced twenty films.

Filmography

Awards
 Bachsas Awards – 1974
 Bangladesh National Film Awards (1994, 1996, 2001)
 Independence Day Award (2013)

Death
Saha died on 27 January 1999 in Dhaka.

References

External links
 

1934 births
1999 deaths
20th-century Bangladeshi male singers
20th-century Bangladeshi singers
Bangladeshi Hindus
People from Chittagong
Bangladeshi composers
Best Music Director National Film Award (Bangladesh) winners
Recipients of the Independence Day Award
Best Music Composer National Film Award (Bangladesh) winners